Tyenna is a small locality in the Shire of Buloke, Victoria, Australia.

Tyenna State School opened in 1915, and was replaced with a one-room school building in 1923. The school closed in 1946, with the building being removed.

References